Pão de Açúcar is a municipality in the Brazilian state of Alagoas. Its population is 24,351 (2020) and its area is 659 km².

Climate

References

Municipalities in Alagoas